Dave Morris (June 7, 1884 – November 27, 1955) was an American film actor of the silent era. He appeared in more than 180 films between 1912 and 1949. He was born in Chicago and died in Los Angeles.

Partial filmography
 Black and White (1913)
 With the Aid of Phrenology (1913)
 Tango Tangles (1914)
 Mixed Nuts (1922)
 The Fighting Demon (1925)
 Tearing Through (1925)
 Crazy to Act (1927)
 Beware of Bachelors (1928)
 The Old Barn (1929)
 Juno and the Paycock (1930)
 Safety in Numbers (1938)
 Swamp Water (1941)

External links

1884 births
1955 deaths
American male film actors
American male silent film actors
20th-century American male actors
Male actors from Chicago